Mary Queen of Scots is a 2018 historical drama film directed by Josie Rourke (in her feature directorial debut) and with a screenplay by Beau Willimon based on John Guy's 2004 biography Queen of Scots: The True Life of Mary Stuart. The film stars Saoirse Ronan as Mary, Queen of Scots, and Margot Robbie as her cousin Queen Elizabeth I. Jack Lowden, Joe Alwyn, David Tennant, and Guy Pearce also star in supporting roles.

The film received mixed reviews, with praise for the performances (particularly Ronan and Robbie) and costumes, but was criticised for the screenplay and several historical inaccuracies. The film received three nominations at the 72nd British Academy Film Awards, and two nominations, for Best Costume Design and Best Makeup and Hairstyling, at the 91st Academy Awards. For her performance, Robbie earned nominations for a SAG Award and BAFTA Award for Best Supporting Actress.

Plot 
In 1561, nineteen-year-old Mary Stuart, the Catholic queen of Scotland, returns to her home country from France following the death of her husband, Francis II of France, to take up her throne, where she is received by her half brother, the Earl of Moray. In neighbouring England, Mary's twenty-eight-year-old cousin Elizabeth is the Protestant queen of England – unmarried, childless, and threatened by Mary's potential claim to her throne. Mary dismisses the cleric John Knox from her court. A Protestant and leader of the Scottish Reformation, Knox views Mary as a danger to the kingdom's Protestant supremacy.

Seeking to weaken her cousin's threat to her sovereignty, Elizabeth arranges for Mary, whom many English Catholics regard as their rightful queen, to be married to an Englishman. She chooses Robert Dudley, whom she secretly loves; although he and Mary are unwilling, news of Elizabeth's smallpox convinces Mary to accept, provided she is named Elizabeth's heir. Reluctant to let go of Dudley, Elizabeth sends Lord Darnley to Scotland with the pretence of living under their religious freedom. Despite sensing the ulterior motive, Mary grows fond of Darnley and eventually accepts his proposal.

Mary's impending marriage causes a constitutional crisis within both realms: Elizabeth is advised to oppose the marriage for fear that Darnley, an English noble, will elevate Mary's claim to the crown; Mary's council is suspicious of Darnley, fearing an English takeover. Both kingdoms demand his return to England but Mary refuses, leading Moray to mount a rebellion against her. Mary marries Darnley, only to discover him in bed with her friend and private secretary, David Rizzio. Mary quashes the rebel forces but spares Rizzio and Moray, and demands that Darnley give her a child. When a child is conceived, Mary declares the child is "heir to Scotland and England" – offending the English.

Moray colludes with Darnley's father Matthew Stewart, 4th Earl of Lennox, to undermine Mary. They spread rumours that her child was illegitimately fathered by Rizzio, driving John Knox to vehemently denounce Mary as an adulteress. Fearing these accusations and the possible discovery of his homosexuality, Darnley is coerced by the underminers to join them in murdering Rizzio, and reluctantly delivers the final blow.

Discovering the plot of weakening her rule and giving Darnley more power, Mary convinces Darnley to side with her and escape with her instead, which turns out to be a ploy for her army to detain him. Mary agrees to pardon the conspirators if presented with evidence that Darnley took part. She ultimately forgives Moray, and asks Elizabeth to be her child's godmother. They agree the child is heir presumptive, despite the English court's hostility. Mary banishes Darnley but refuses to divorce him, despite the appeals of her council, which approaches her adviser and protector, the Earl of Bothwell, to have him killed.

After Darnley's murder, Mary is forced to flee without her child. Bothwell advises that her council has decided she must marry a Scotsman immediately—and that Scotsman should be Bothwell himself.  Mary resists, suspecting he was involved in Darnley's murder, but after he threatens her and subsequently rapes her, she consents. This induces Knox to preach to the Scots that Mary is a "harlot" who had her husband killed, leading Moray and her court to demand her abdication. Despite her objections, Mary eventually abdicates and flees to England.

Elizabeth arranges a clandestine meeting, where Mary asks for help to take back her throne. Unable to go to war on behalf of a Catholic, Elizabeth instead promises a safe exile in England as long as Mary does not aid her enemies. Mary responds that if she does, it will only be because Elizabeth forced her to do so, and threatens that should Elizabeth murder her, she should remember that she "murdered her own sister and queen". Placing Mary under house arrest, Elizabeth receives compelling evidence that Mary conspired with her enemies to have her assassinated, and orders Mary's execution. Elizabeth laments that even if the evidence is untrue, she has to order her execution, for she has given her whole self to the throne, but fondly remembers Mary for her bravery and beauty. As Mary walks to the scaffold, a remorseful Elizabeth cries for Mary, who reveals a bright red dress, implying herself to be a martyr. In her final thoughts, Mary wishes her son James well and hopes for peace upon his reign.

A post-script notes that upon Elizabeth's death in 1603, James became the first monarch to rule both Scotland and England.

Cast 

 Saoirse Ronan as Mary, Queen of Scots, and Elizabeth's cousin
 Margot Robbie as Queen Elizabeth I, Mary's cousin and the Queen of England 
 Jack Lowden as Henry Darnley, Mary's second husband
 Joe Alwyn as Robert Dudley, Elizabeth's counselor and lover
 David Tennant as John Knox, founder of the Church of Scotland
 Guy Pearce as William Cecil, advisor to Elizabeth
 Gemma Chan as Bess of Hardwick, a friend and confidante of Elizabeth and keeper of Mary
 Martin Compston as Lord Bothwell, Mary's third husband
 Ismael Cruz Córdova as David Rizzio, Mary's close friend and confidant
 Brendan Coyle as Earl of Lennox, father of Lord Darnley
 Ian Hart as Lord Maitland, Secretary of State of Scotland
 Adrian Lester as Lord Randolph, Elizabeth's ambassador to Scotland
 James McArdle as James, Earl of Moray, Regent of Scotland

In addition, Eileen O’Higgins, Maria-Victoria Dragus, Izuka Hoyle and Liah O'Prey are seen throughout the film as Mary's personal attendants, historically known as "The Four Marys", Mary Beaton, Mary Fleming, Mary Seton and Mary Livingston, respectively. Alex Beckett, who appears as Sir Walter Mildmay, English Chancellor of the Exchequer, died at age 35, seven months before the film's release; the film is dedicated to his memory.

The director, Josie Rourke, followed the principle of colour-blind casting. The movie portrays the English ambassador to the Scottish Court, Lord Thomas Randolph, as a black man, which he was not. Gemma Chan's character is Elizabeth Hardwick, who in real life was white.  Rourke told the L.A. Times: "I was really clear, I would not direct an all-white period drama."

Production 
The film was originally planned to be a Scarlett Johansson vehicle, scheduled to begin shooting in mid-2007 on a $25–30 million budget. After Johansson dropped out, the film languished in development hell for several years.  On 9 August 2012, it was announced that Saoirse Ronan would play the title role of Mary Stuart. It took another five years, until 21 April 2017, until it was announced that Margot Robbie was cast to play Queen Elizabeth I, and that the film was scheduled to commence principal photography in August 2017. The film based on John Guy's biography My Heart Is My Own: The Life of Mary Queen of Scots would be produced by Working Title's Tim Bevan, Eric Fellner, and Debra Hayward, and HBI Production's James Biggam. Josie Rourke was announced to direct the film from an adapted screenplay by Beau Willimon.

On 13 June 2017, Jack Lowden was announced to play Lord Darnley, while Joe Alwyn was announced to play Robert Dudley. On 22 June 2017, it was reported that Martin Compston was cast in the film to play James Hepburn, 4th Earl of Bothwell, the third husband of Stuart. On 23 June 2017, German-Romanian actress Maria-Victoria Dragus had also joined the cast to play Scottish noblewoman and childhood friend of Stuart, Mary Fleming, marking her English-language debut in film, having a minor role previously in Australian teen drama Dance Academy. On 17 August 2017, Brendan Coyle, David Tennant, and Guy Pearce joined the cast, followed by Gemma Chan the next day. On 22 August, Ismael Cruz Córdova was cast to play David Rizzio, Mary's close friend and confidant.

Focus Features handled the domestic rights while Universal Pictures handled the international distribution. The crew on the film included Academy Award winners costume designer Alexandra Byrne, hair and make-up designer Jenny Shircore and editor Chris Dickens; Emmy Award-winning production designer James Merifield; and BAFTA Award-winning cinematographer John Mathieson.

Principal photography began on 17 August 2017, in various locations around the United Kingdom, including Scotland.

Release
It had its world premiere at the closing night gala of AFI Fest on 15 November 2018 in Los Angeles, CA. The film was released in the United States on 7 December 2018, and in the United Kingdom on 18 January 2019.

Historical accuracy 
Historians have heavily criticised the inaccuracies of the story. Mary and Elizabeth's letters to each other are believed to have been their only sources of communication, and they are not known to have met.

There have been suggestions that Mary would not have had a Scottish accent. The five-year-old Mary was sent to France, where she grew up in the French Court.

Estelle Paranque, an expert on Queen Elizabeth I, told The Daily Telegraph: "It shows a friendship at first, but there was not a friendship, Elizabeth tried to be kind to her at first but Mary never saw Elizabeth as an equal. She saw her as a rival from the start."

Soundtrack

Reception

Box office
Mary Queen of Scots grossed $16.5 million in the United States and Canada, and $29.9 million in other countries, for a total worldwide gross of $46.4 million.

Critical response
The website's critical consensus reads, "Mary Queen of Scots delivers uneven period political thrills while offering a brilliant showcase for the talents of its well-matched leads." On Metacritic, the film has a weighted average score of 60 out of 100, based on 47 critics, indicating "mixed or average reviews". Audiences polled by PostTrak gave the film 2.5 out of 5 stars, with 38% saying they would definitely recommend it.

Reviewers criticised the film's historicity, its plotting and its sex scenes. Emily Yoshida of New York magazine's Vulture site called it "a kind of nothing of a film. It's neither a rigorous history lesson nor a particularly interesting work of drama and character"; Shane Watson of The Telegraph called it "history porn for the Instagram generation"; while A.O. Scott of The New York Times said that "students of Scottish history may be surprised to learn that the fate of the nation was partly decided by an act of cunnilingus".

Accolades

References

External links 
 
 

2018 directorial debut films
2018 biographical drama films
2010s historical drama films
American biographical drama films
American historical drama films
British biographical drama films
British historical drama films
Films about cousins
Films about Elizabeth I
Films about Mary, Queen of Scots
Films based on biographies
Films produced by Eric Fellner
Films produced by Tim Bevan
Films scored by Max Richter
Films set in the 1560s
Films shot in Edinburgh
Films shot in Gloucestershire
Focus Features films
Universal Pictures films
Working Title Films films
Biographical films about British royalty
2010s English-language films
2010s American films
2010s British films